Cherkovo is the name of several rural localities in Russia.

Cherkovo, Tver Oblast, a village in Nerlskoye Rural Settlement of Kalyazinsky District in Tver Oblast
Cherkovo, Vologda Oblast, a village in Gulinsky Selsoviet of Belozersky District in Vologda Oblast